The word Skutt may refer to:

 V. J. Skutt (1902–1993), president and chairman of Mutual of Omaha 
 Thomas Skutt (1930–2000), president and chairman of Mutual of Omaha.
 V. J. and Angela Skutt Catholic High School
 Lille Skutt, a cartoon character; see Bamse.
George Skutt, 17th-century English politician